Jon Ferguson "Jay" Mohr (born August 23, 1970) is an American actor, comedian, and radio host. He is known for his roles as film producer Peter Dragon in the TV comedy series Action, Professor Rick Payne in the TV series Ghost Whisperer (2006–2008), the title role in the CBS sitcom Gary Unmarried (2008–2010), as a featured cast member on the sketch comedy show Saturday Night Live (1993–1995), and as the back-stabbing sports agent Bob Sugar in Jerry Maguire (1996). Since making his feature film debut with Jerry Maguire, he has appeared in films such as Suicide Kings (1997), Picture Perfect (1997), Paulie (1998), Mafia! (1998), Small Soldiers (1998), Go (1999), Cherry Falls (2000), The Adventures of Pluto Nash (2002), Are We There Yet? (2005), Street Kings (2008), Hereafter (2010) and The Incredible Burt Wonderstone (2013).

Mohr hosts his own podcast Mohr Stories on the SModcast Network and, since September 2015, hosted Jay Mohr Sports, a daily midday sports radio talk show on Fox Sports Radio. Mohr left Fox Sports Radio in January 2016 to pursue acting ventures. He was nominated for a Primetime Emmy Award as the inaugural host and executive producer of Last Comic Standing (2003–2006).

Early life
Mohr was born in Verona, New Jersey to Iva Jean (née Ferguson), a nurse, and Jon Wood Mohr, a marketing executive. He has two sisters, Julia and Virginia. He is of Scottish descent. Mohr was raised Presbyterian, but later converted to Roman Catholicism. He graduated from Verona High School in 1988. In high school, he was on the wrestling team, and he served as its captain during his senior year. Soon after graduating high school, Mohr was part of the cast of "Biloxi Blues" at the Nutley Little Theater in Nutley, New Jersey.

Career

Acting career
After appearing on MTV's "Half Hour Comedy Hour" show on April 2, 1991, MTV offered him a job hosting music videos as a VJ, which Mohr turned down. Instead, Mohr ended up hosting the lip-sync contest game show Lip Service on MTV, which earned him a CableACE Award. He then appeared as a featured player for the 1993–94 and 1994–95 seasons of Saturday Night Live. His memoir, Gasping for Airtime: Two Years in the Trenches of Saturday Night Live, details this tumultuous period of his life, including his battle with chronic panic attacks. He later credited his SNL co-star Sarah Silverman with saving his life by helping him treat the problem.

Mohr had a recurring role in the first season of The Jeff Foxworthy Show as Jeff Foxworthy's brother, Wayne. Mohr's first major film role was in 1996 when he played the conniving Bob Sugar, a sleazy sports agent in Jerry Maguire, followed in 1997 by a starring role in Picture Perfect with Jennifer Aniston. In 1999, Mohr starred in the television series Action, in which he played sleazy film producer Peter Dragon. He was the voice-over artist for Fox Sports Net's Beyond the Glory. Mohr appeared in additional movies including Suicide Kings, Are We There Yet?, Small Soldiers, Go, Pay It Forward, and The Groomsmen.  Mohr was offered a late night talk show job by Michael Eisner, but he declined, instead convincing Eisner to let him host a talk show on ESPN, Mohr Sports, which ran briefly in 2001 before being cancelled. The talk show job Mohr passed was then offered to Jimmy Kimmel and became Jimmy Kimmel Live!

In 2003 and 2004, Mohr created, hosted, and was executive producer of NBC's Last Comic Standing reality television program. The show aired for three seasons, but was cancelled near the end of the third season due to poor ratings, only to be renewed later. Mohr was very vocal toward NBC concerning its cancellation and did not return for the show's fourth season in 2006. Mohr was replaced with new host Anthony Clark, but was credited as a consultant. On the season finale of Last Comic Standing 4, Mohr performed as a guest comedian. His recurring role on the TV series Ghost Whisperer developed into a regular role. He appeared in "My Own Private Practice Guy", a 2003 episode of the sitcom Scrubs, and in three episodes of The West Wing in 2004 in the recurring role of Taylor Reid. Parts of Mohr's stand up was featured in Comedy Central's animated series Shorties Watchin' Shorties. In 2005, he and his Giraffe Productions company inked a deal with Sony Pictures Television.

Mohr starred as newly divorced father Gary Brooks, the title character, for two seasons on the CBS sitcom Gary Unmarried. Paula Marshall played his ex-wife. In January 2010 he took the role as Billy in Clint Eastwood's thriller film Hereafter. He also guest-starred on NBC's Outlaw in 2010.

Radio
Mohr has contributed frequently to The Jim Rome Show and often guest-hosted the program.  Mohr finished in 7th place in the 2007 Smack-Off, 6th place in the 2008 Smack-Off, 10th place in the 2009 Smack-Off, 6th place in the 2010 Smack-Off, and 6th place in the 2011 Smack-Off. Mohr is also known to do "drive-by" call-ins to the show, typically to promote one of his stand-up shows or live events.

On January 2, 2013, Mohr replaced Rome on Fox Sports Radio, as he hosts a daily talk show titled Jay Mohr Sports in Rome's longtime 12 to 3 p.m. (ET) timeslot, as Rome moved his show from Premiere Networks (the distributor of Fox Sports Radio) to CBS Sports Radio. The show can be heard on several internet platforms and regional affiliates. On November 3, 2014, Jay Mohr Sports moved to the 3 to 6pm time slot, so Rich Eisen could take over the 12-3pm slot on Fox Sports Radio.

Podcast
Mohr hosts his own podcast titled Mohr Stories. The podcast was hosted on the SModcast Network, often taped in his garage, which he has dubbed Fake Mustache Studios.  On May 4, 2012, Mohr announced his amicable departure from the SModcast network. He has since begun hosting Mohr Stories on his own network, Fake Mustache Studios.

Other work
In June 2004, Mohr's first book, Gasping for Airtime: Two Years in the Trenches of Saturday Night Live, was published by Hyperion and chronicled his two years working on Saturday Night Live. In May 2010, publisher Simon & Schuster released Mohr's second book, No Wonder My Parents Drank: Tales from a Stand-Up Dad.

Mohr's album Happy. And A Lot was nominated for the Grammy Award for Best Comedy Album at the 58th Annual Grammy Awards. The material was written by Nikki Cox, his wife at the time.

Mohr has hosted the NASCAR Cup Series Awards Ceremony in Las Vegas since 2013.

In 2016, Mohr became the host of the Los Angeles Rams pregame show airing Saturday evenings after college football on KABC-TV. He was replaced as the host in November 2016 with no explanation.

Personal life

Mohr has a son, Jackson, from his six-year marriage to former model Nicole Chamberlain.

He married actress Nikki Cox on December 29, 2006. Cox wrote one of his stand-up shows. In December 2008, he filed legal papers requesting a legal name change to Jon Ferguson Cox Mohr, adding his wife's surname. Their son, Meredith Daniel Mohr, was born on May 5, 2011. Mohr confirmed on May 16, 2017 during The Adam Carolla Show that he and Cox were "in the middle" of a divorce. Their divorce was finalized in August 2018.

Mohr became engaged to Los Angeles Lakers owner Jeanie Buss in December 2022.

Filmography

Film

Television

Video Games

References

External links

Jay Mohr SI.com archive
Weekly column on FOXSports.com
Jay Mohr Sports on FOX Sports Radio

1970 births
Living people
Male actors from New Jersey
American male film actors
American impressionists (entertainers)
American podcasters
American stand-up comedians
American male television actors
American television talk show hosts
Converts to Roman Catholicism
Converts to Roman Catholicism from Presbyterianism
Former Presbyterians
People from Verona, New Jersey
Verona High School (New Jersey) alumni
American people of Scottish descent
20th-century American male actors
21st-century American male actors
20th-century American comedians
21st-century American comedians
American male comedians
American sketch comedians
American male video game actors
American male voice actors
Catholics from New Jersey
Disney people